Cordylidae is a family of small- to medium-sized lizards that occur in southern and eastern Africa. They are commonly known as girdled lizards, spinytail lizards, or girdle-tail lizards.

Cordylidae is closely related to the family Gerrhosauridae, occurring in Africa and Madagascar. These two scientific families of lizards, known as Cordyliformes or Cordyloidea, are sometimes combined into a larger concept of Cordylidae. Recent molecular analyses confirm the clade made up of Cordylidae and Gerrhosauridae (Cordyloidea) and place it in a larger clade including Xantusiidae (Cordylomorpha Vidal & Hedges, 2009).

Description and behavior 

Girdled lizards are diurnal and insectivorous. They are terrestrial, mostly inhabiting crevices in rocky terrain, although at least one species digs burrows and another lives under exfoliating bark on trees. They have flattened heads and bodies, and are distinguished by a heavy armour of osteoderms and large, rectangular, scales, arranged in regular rows around the body and tail. Many species have rings of spines on the tail, that aid in wedging the animal into sheltering crevices, and also in dissuading predators.

Most species have four limbs, but those in the genus Chamaesaura are almost entirely limbless, with only tiny spikes in place of the hind limbs. The family includes both egg-laying and ovoviviparous species.

Genera

References

External links 
 Cordylidae

 
Lizard families
Taxa named by Leopold Fitzinger